Lecanora thysanophora is an eastern North American lichen in the family Lecanoraceae. It is a common crustose species, easily recognized by its sorediate thallus, usually encircled by a grey prothallus.

It has been reported from the Seychelles.

See also
List of Lecanora species

References

Lichen species
Lichens described in 2000
Fungi of the United States
thysanophora
Fungi of Seychelles
Fungi without expected TNC conservation status